Cimemoxin (INN), or cyclohexylmethylhydrazine, is a hydrazine monoamine oxidase inhibitor (MAOI) antidepressant which was never marketed.

Synthesis
It possesses 50 times the relative activity of iproniazid and 25x nialamide (see patent). 

3-Cyclohexene-1-carbaldehyde [100-50-5] (aka 1,2,3,6-Tetrahydrobenzaldehyde) is reacted with N-acetylhydrazine to give the hydrazone, which is reduced by catalytic hydrogenation. The acetyl group is removed by acid hydrolysis.

See also 
 Monoamine oxidase inhibitor
 Hydrazine (antidepressant)

References 

Antidepressants
Hydrazines
Monoamine oxidase inhibitors